Maurizio Casagrande (born 4 November 1961) is an Italian actor and film and stage director.

Life and career 
Born in Naples, the son of the actor and director Antonio, Casagrande studied as a baritone at the Conservatorio di San Pietro a Majella and studied piano, jazz drums and guitar at the Liceo Musicale Bellini in his hometown. Graduated in acting from the Bottega Teatrale del Mezzogiorno, he is mainly active on stage, working intensively with Vincenzo Salemme since 1992. He made his film debut in the late 1990s in a number of Salemme's comedy films, which gave him an almost immediate popularity. After directing a number of stage works, he made his feature film directorial debut in 2012, with the comedy Una donna per la vita.

References

External links 

 

1961 births
Male actors from Naples
Italian male stage actors
Italian male film actors
Italian male television actors
Living people
Italian theatre directors
Italian film directors
Film people from Naples
Theatre people from Naples